The 1922–23 season was the 23rd season of competitive football in Belgium. Union Saint-Gilloise won their 8th Division I title. At the end of the season, SC Anderlechtois and Uccle Sport were relegated to the Promotion, while RFC Liégeois and RC de Gand were promoted.The format of the Promotion was changed for the following season, with two Divisions of 14 clubs each and the winners of each Division promoting to Division I.

National team

* Belgium score given first

Key
 H = Home match
 A = Away match
 N = On neutral ground
 F = Friendly
 o.g. = own goal

Honours

Final league tables

Division I

Promotion

External links
RSSSF archive - Final tables 1895-2002
Belgian clubs history